Green Bay is an arm of Lake Michigan, located along the south coast of Michigan's Upper Peninsula and the east coast of Wisconsin. It is separated from the rest of the lake by the Door Peninsula in Wisconsin, the Garden Peninsula in Michigan, and the chain of islands between them, all formed by the Niagara Escarpment.

At the southern end of the bay is the city of Green Bay, Wisconsin, where the Fox River enters the bay. The Leo Frigo Memorial Bridge (formerly known as the Tower Drive bridge) spans the point where the bay begins and the Fox River ends, as the river flows south to north into the bay. Around mid-bay are Sturgeon Bay and the Peshtigo River. The Sturgeon Bay serves the city named after the bay as a shortcut for large ships to use to bypass the Door Peninsula, while the Peshtigo River serves Peshtigo and Crivitz. Locally, the bay is called the Bay of Green Bay to distinguish it from the city. 

The bay is located in parts of five counties in Wisconsin (Brown, Door, Kewaunee, Marinette, Oconto), and two in Michigan (Delta, Menominee).

History

Oconto is home to Copper Culture State Park, which has remains dated to around 5000-6000 BC. It is a burial ground of the Copper Culture Indians. This burial ground is considered to be the oldest cemetery in Wisconsin and one of the oldest in the nation. The Ho-Chunk believe that they were created on the shores of Green Bay at a place called Red Banks.

The French Jesuit, Roman Catholic priest, and missionary, Father Claude-Jean Allouez said the first Mass in Oconto on December 3, 1669.

The bay was named la baie des Puants (literally, "the bay of the Stinks") by the French explorer Jean Nicolet as shown on many French maps of the 17th and 18th centuries. According to George R. Stewart, the French received the name from their Indian guides, who called the natives living near Green Bay by a derogatory word meaning "Stinkers", thus the bay was the "Bay of the Stinkers", but this name perplexed the French, and Jacques Marquette thought the name might relate to the smell of the swamps when he explored the area in May 1673. His fellow explorer Louis Joliet, with two canoes and five voyageurs of French-Indian ancestry (Métis) were on their way to find the Mississippi River. They travelled up the Fox River, nearly to its headwaters. The French also called the bay Baie Verte, and the English kept this name as Green Bay. The name of the bay in the Menominee language is Pūcīhkit, or "bay that smells like something rotting".

In 1671 and 1673, Louis André and Jacques Marquette described fluctuations in the water level of the bay and discussed what they thought caused them.

Ferromanganese nodules, currents, reefs, and fish
Ferromanganese nodules have been found in the bay. Todorokite occurs within the nodules.

There are numerous reefs of exposed bedrock in the Porte des Mortes passage and in the bay.

North of the peninsula, warm water from Green Bay flows into Lake Michigan on the surface, while at the same time, cold lakewater enters Green Bay deep underneath.

In a study looking at the contents' of fish stomachs, walleye were found to each between 5-6% and lake whitefish and yellow perch over the course of a year. However, south of Chambers Island, walleye eat considerably more lake whitefish in May and June. Walleye were found to eat more yellow perch on an annual basis, but not more than 15% of their overall diet during any particular month. 

Walleye and Lake whitefish in Green Bay for the most part do not compete for the same prey, especially south of Chambers Island. Lake whitefish and yellow perch in the bay compete strongly for the same prey south of Chambers Island, and compete moderately north of it.

Environmental concerns

Areas of concern 
According to the Environmental Protection Agency, "Areas of Concern are designated by the International Joint Commission as geographic areas in the Great Lakes basin having severe environmental degradation. There are 43 Areas of Concern with 26 in the United States, 17 in Canada, and five shared by the two countries."

Background

Lower green Bay Area of Concern was designated in 1987 under the Great Lakes Water Quality agreement.

It was designated by these sources of pollution:

 Affected by runoff pollution from urban and rural areas, municipal and industrial wastewater discharges and degraded habitats. 

 Industrialization was a major factor in this becoming contaminated 

 High turbidity, sedimentation, fluctuating dissolved oxygen, frequent algal blooms, degraded fish/wildlife/plant populations and adverse toxicant impacts. 

 This AOC is a shallow environment that has a rapid recycling system which also contributes to water quality issues

The seasonal dead zone in the lower part of the bay may have gotten longer from 2009-2015.

Beneficial Use Impairments 
Beneficial Use Impairments (BUI) are a change in the chemical, physical or biological integrity of the Great Lakes system sufficient to cause significant environmental degradation. The International Joint Commission identified 14 BUIs listed below. All BUIs that have been designated for an AOC, must be removed for the AOC to be considered restored and begin the delisting process.

Green Bay BUI's: 

 Restrictions on fish and wildlife consumption
 Tainting of fish and wildlife flavor
 Degradation of fish and wildlife populations
 Fish tumors or other deformities
 Degradation of aesthetics
 Restriction on dredging activities
 Loss of fish and wildlife habitat
 Bird/animal deformities or reproductive problems
 Excess of nutrients from pollutants 
 Restrictions on drinking water consumption, or taste and odor
 Beach closings
 Degradation of microorganism populations

Timeline of restoration 
Since 1988 over three quarters of the 120 remedial actions recommended by the lower green bay remedial action plan have been implemented or initiated. 

Industrialization was a major factor regarding the Lower Green Bay becoming contaminated; significant contributors were land water use (agriculture, logging, industry), high turbidity, sedimentation, frequent algal blooms, degraded fish/wildlife/plant populations and adverse toxicant impacts.

 1988: First stage of action plan is released
 1993: Update to action plan, current progress is released and future goals are identified
 2003: USFWS releases an environmental assessment and restoration plan for the AOC
 2003-2008: E.Coli measured consistently on beaches, shows overall health is good, but more projects needed to delist 
 2009: Wisconsin DNR identifies delisting targets for each of the BUI's 
 2010-2011: Laws passed to reduce/ban phosphorus in household materials, reduce phosphorus runoff from farms, and set new water quality standards. 
 2011: Stage 2 action plan update is released, describing key actions taken since 199, and identified future projects associated with the different BUI's 
 2012: Update action plan, US army Corps of Engineers begins Cat Island restoration project, and 360,000 cubic yards of PCB-contaminated sediments are dredged 
 2013: UofW extension released fact sheet of BUIs status in the AOC, judge rules that all companies EPA considers responsible for PCB contamination must complete the required cleanup work

Cleanup 
Past Emergency Clean Up: In 1999 and 2000, EPA oversaw a dredging project done by some of the paper companies about 3 miles upstream from the mouth of the Lower Fox River.  It removed 80,000 cubic yards of PCB-contaminated sediment, containing 3,400 pounds of PCBs.

2019 marks the 16th year of clean up of the lower Green Bay. River clean up is scheduled for late March depending on ice conditions. Monitoring will continue to study fish, water, and PCB concentrations.  Once the lower Green Bay clean up is complete long term monitoring will still be done on the entirety of the river.

Gallery

See also
Peshtigo Fire: a firestorm that affected land on both sides of Green Bay, and the deadliest fire in the history of the United States

References

Bays of Michigan
Bays of Wisconsin
Bodies of water of Brown County, Wisconsin
Bodies of water of Delta County, Michigan
Bodies of water of Door County, Wisconsin
Bodies of water of Kewaunee County, Wisconsin
Bodies of water of Marinette County, Wisconsin
Bodies of water of Menominee County, Michigan
Bodies of water of Oconto County, Wisconsin
Bays of Lake Michigan